The Silver Spike is a spin-off novel from Glen Cook's The Black Company. The story combines elements of epic fantasy and dark fantasy as it follows two former members of The Black Company and the formerly renowned "White Rose" down their own path after parting ways with the company following the events at the conclusion of The White Rose.

Plot summary
The Dominator was a wizard of immense power who could not be killed by his enemies. He was, however, defeated and his evil essence imprisoned in a silver spike. The power inherent in the spike is so greatly feared and desired that some try to steal it, while others try to keep it from falling into anyone's hands.

Characters in "The Silver Spike"

Spike Hunters
 Tully Stahl
 Smeds Stahl – Tully's cousin
 Old Man Fish (Forto Reibus)
 Timmy Locan

The White Rose Rebellion
 Darling (Tonie Fisk) – The White Rose
 Silent – Wizard formerly of The Black Company
 Bomanz the Wakener (Seth Chalk)
 Brother Bear Torque
 Donkey Dick “Stubby” Torque
 Paddlefoot Torque

The Northern Empire
 Brigadier Wildbrand
 Gossamer – Wizard and Spidersilk's twin
 Spidersilk
 Exile – Imperial wizard from Charm

Others
 Philodendron Case (the narrator)
 Raven – formerly of The Black Company
 Toadkiller Dog 
 The Limper – one of The Ten Who Were Taken

External links
 
 

Novels by Glen Cook
1989 American novels
American fantasy novels
Tor Books books